24: Legacy is an American television series created by Manny Coto and Evan Katz that aired on Fox network from February 5 to April 17, 2017. The series is a spin-off of 24 which was created by Joel Surnow and Robert Cochran and its premiere served as the lead-out program for Super Bowl LI before moving to its regular time slot of Monday at 8:00 p.m. The series' premiere was watched by 17.6 million people, the lowest post-Super Bowl program viewership since 2003's Alias but the most viewed episode in the franchise's history.

Consisting of 12 episodes, the show follows the life of war hero and ex-United States Army Ranger Sergeant Eric Carter (Corey Hawkins) using real time method of narration. Miranda Otto plays Rebecca Ingram, the former National Director of the now revived Counter Terrorist Unit in Washington, D.C. Set three years after the events of 24: Live Another Day, it adheres to the real time concept of covering the events of a 24-hour period and begins and ends at 12:00 pm. However, like Live Another Day, there is a 12-hour time jump within the final episode.

In June 2017, Fox announced that the series was canceled. At the time, Fox had plans to develop a new incarnation of the 24 franchise. Those plans were later cancelled.

Synopsis
After leading a mission to eliminate terrorist leader Sheikh Ibrahim bin-Khalid, Eric Carter (Corey Hawkins), an ex-United States Army Ranger Sergeant who returns to the U.S. and finds out that he and his squad mates are being hunted down and killed because one of his team unwittingly stole a flash drive containing a list of US-based terrorist sleeper cells and the codes to activate them for future attacks. With nowhere else to turn, Carter asks CTU to help him save his life while also stopping a series of devastating terrorist sleeper cell attacks on American soil. The series takes place three years after the events of 24: Live Another Day and is set in Washington, D.C.

Cast and characters

Starring
 Corey Hawkins as Eric Carter, an ex-United States Army Ranger Sergeant who has returned to the U.S. and is determined to stop the terrorist attacks that may follow.
 Miranda Otto as Rebecca Ingram, the former National Director of the Counter Terrorist Unit, and the wife of Senator John Donovan, who is running for President of the United States. 
 Anna Diop as Nicole Carter, a nurse and Eric's wife.
 Teddy Sears as Keith Mullins, the new, ambitious and driven National Director of CTU, who previously worked under Rebecca.
 Ashley Thomas as Isaac Carter, a drug dealer and older brother of Eric who is angry at him for their bitter past involving Eric's wife, Nicole.
 Dan Bucatinsky as Andy Shalowitz, a communication analyst at CTU who is trusted by Rebecca and is unhappily paired with computer analyst Mariana.
 Coral Peña as Mariana Stiles, a bright, young, self-taught computer analyst and cousin of former CTU intelligence analyst Edgar Stiles; she is paired with Andy.
 Charlie Hofheimer as Ben Grimes, Eric's former comrade and an ex-Sergeant in the Army Ranger unit who is now suffering from PTSD.
 Sheila Vand as Nilaa Mizrani, Senator John Donovan's campaign manager.
 Raphael Acloque as Jadalla bin-Khalid, a university student who has embraced his father's jihadist campaign since his death.
 Gerald McRaney as Henry Donovan, the father of presidential candidate John Donovan, who is a powerful oil man and passionately devoted father, dedicated to putting his son in the White House, no matter what the obstacles.
 Jimmy Smits as John Donovan, a Senator who is running for President, and Rebecca Ingram's husband.

Special guest star
 Carlos Bernard as Tony Almeida, a former CTU Los Angeles Director and mercenary with a checkered past.

Guest starring
 Zayne Emory as Drew Phelps, a junior at Marshall High School who has a crush on Amira.
 Kathryn Prescott as Amira Dudayev, a high school student and Khasan's sister.
 Kevin Christy as David Harris, a chemistry teacher planning a bombing along with his student and secret lover, Amira.
 Bailey Chase as Thomas Locke, CTU’s Director of Field Operations.
 Laith Nakli as Kusuma, second-in-command of Jadalla and one of the jihadists looking for Eric Carter.
 Tiffany Hines as Aisha, Isaac's girlfriend who helps him with his drug-dealing business.
 Themo Melikidze as Khasan Dudayev, Amira's brother and one of bin-Khalid's sleeper cells.
 Daniel Zacapa as Luis Diaz, Senator John Donovan's maternal uncle, and a political operative for his nephew's campaign for President of the United States.
 Moran Atias as Sidra, Tony's associate who instigates feelings of distrust between Tony and Ingram.
 Dylan Ramsey as Rashid Al-Sabi, a jihadi soldier in bin-Khalid's organization and Malik's brother.
 Saad Siddiqui as Malik Al-Sabi, a jihadi soldier in bin-Khalid's organization and Rashid's brother.
 Oded Fehr as Asim Naseri, second-in-command of bin-Khalid.
 Eli Danker as Sheikh Ibrahim bin-Khalid, a terrorist leader and Jadalla's father.
 James Moses Black as Donald Simms, the Director of National Intelligence.
 Zeeko Zaki as Hamid, a jihadi supporting Jadalla bin-Khalid's campaign.

Episodes

Production

Conception
In January 2015, another installment of the 24 franchise was pitched by executive producers Howard Gordon, Evan Katz, Manny Coto and Brian Grazer. It revolves around a stable of supporting characters rather than Kiefer Sutherland as Jack Bauer in the lead role. In May 2015, Fox announced the continued development of a new version of 24. In June 2015, Howard Gordon stated that a spin-off would feature a new young male lead, alongside a slightly older, more experienced, female agent. Evan Katz and Manny Coto are confirmed to return as writers and executive producers. It is confirmed that this spin-off includes the "real time" feature as Gordon says it is the tradition of the show.

In January 2016, Fox announced it had ordered a pilot for a spin-off series entitled 24: Legacy, featuring a new cast with no returning characters. Although the series retains the real-time format, it consists of only 12 episodes, using time jumps to cover the events of a single day. The two lead characters are a male military hero returning home and a female who is a former head of CTU. Stephen Hopkins, who directed the original 24 pilot and several first-season episodes, directed the Legacy pilot. In April 2016, Fox officially greenlit the series with a 12-episode order. Frequent episode director Jon Cassar also returned as director and producer for Legacy, directing 6 of the 12 episodes. Sean Callery is set to return as composer for the series. Deadline reported on May 5, 2016, that Nikki Toscano had inked a deal with 20th Century Fox, and would serve as co-producer on the show. Although previously reported that no former characters would appear on the show, producers hinted at the possibility that Mary Lynn Rajskub would appear on the show as Chloe O'Brian. In an interview with Digital Spy, Katz revealed that the script for the first episode took eight months to write.

Appearance of Jack Bauer

In June 2015, Sutherland said, when asked about the future of Jack Bauer, "I am not coming back to do 24. Sutherland said that 24 is such a great idea, that this could go on forever". Sutherland said he felt it was important to have a new cast to refresh the series, and he hopes to maybe have a cameo in the future. In September 2015, Sutherland seemingly ruled out any further involvement with the show, stating that he would "definitely not return in any way". In February 2016, Sutherland said regarding about possibly returning to 24: "I've learned enough over the last few years to not say never. We were never going to do a season nine when we finished after the eighth season. I said we were done. So I'm going to just say we'll see." He also said regarding the Legacy pilot script that it is "really cool" and that he would be the "first person to watch it".

Writing
Katz stated in an interview that it took eight months to write the first script for the first episode. He stated that one of the difficulties was that "It had to meet people's expectations, which were high and should have been high." He also revealed that the show begins three years after the events in 24: Live Another Day and is set in Washington, D.C. The series introduces CTU's national headquarters located in Washington, D.C. CTU offices located in Los Angeles and New York City have previously been shown on 24.

In an interview with Newsday, showrunner Howard Gordon talked about the conception of the show as he said:

During the 2016 San Diego Comic-Con, the producers called the series "an expansion of the 24 universe," rather than a reboot of the original series. The producers revealed that they had chosen a new main character rather than Jack Bauer for the series as they felt they "had exhausted the former CTU agent's story". Executive producer Gordon commented that "The groundwork that started the series is that we all felt Jack Bauer told his story with Live Another Day. Kiefer read the script after it was written and saw the pilot after it was shot and loved it." With a presidential election plot, the producers decided to be neutral in referencing real-life presidential candidates. Evan Katz explained that "You never know who's affiliated with what. We started writing it before it was clear who the frontrunners would be, so it's really neutral in that way."

Casting

The role of Eric Carter, the male lead, was announced to be portrayed by Corey Hawkins on January 25, 2016, following lengthy negotiations. Hawkins was the only actor considered for the role, after casting director Lisa Miller Katz watched his performance in Straight Outta Compton. On the same day, Miranda Otto was announced to have landed the female lead as Rebecca Ingram, the former CTU-Director. Otto immediately accepted the role when she was offered the part, stating that her reason was that she wanted a role involving "that world of CIA and terrorism," similar to her role on Homeland.

In February 2016, several castings were announced. On February 16, 2016, Deadline announced that Anna Diop had joined the show as Nicole Carter, Eric's wife. A week later, Teddy Sears was announced to have been cast as Keith Mullins, the head of CTU. Several days later, TVLine reported that Jimmy Smits had landed the role as John Donovan, the husband of Rebecca Ingram and a powerful U.S. Senator with higher political aspirations. In March 2016, it was announced that Dan Bucatinsky, Coral Pena and Charlie Hofheimer had been cast for the show. Bucatinsky and Pena were cast as Andy and Gia, two communication analysts at CTU, while Hofheimer was cast as Marcus, Eric's former partner in the Army Ranger unit, now suffering PTSD. A few days later, Ashley Thomas was announced to have been cast as Isaac Carter, Eric's older brother.

The Hollywood Reporter announced on March 9, 2016, that Zayne Emory had been cast as Drew Phelps, a junior at Marshall High School, who has a crush on Amira. Sheila Vand was cast as Nilaa Mizrani, the campaign director of Sen. Donovan. It was reported on June 4, 2016, that Kathryn Prescott had been added as Amira Dudayev, and appear in a recurring role. On September 29, 2016, it was announced that Tiffany Hines and Bailey Chase had been cast in recurring roles for the series. Hines plays Aisha, Isaac Carter's girlfriend, while Chase plays Locke, the head of field operations at CTU Washington, D.C.

Variety announced on October 5, 2016, that Veronica Cartwright and Laith Nakli had been cast in a series regular and recurring role, respectively. Cartwright plays Margaret Donovan, Senator John Donovan's mother, while Nakli portrays Kusuma, a battle-hardened jihadist and fighter who is on the hunt for Eric Carter. During the press tour at New York Comic Con, the producers of the show announced that 24-alum Carlos Bernard would return as Tony Almeida in a recurring role for 24: Legacy. On October 24, 2016, Deadline announced that the show had cast Raphael Acloque and Themo Melikidze in a series regular and a recurring role, respectively. Aclogue plays Jadalla bin-Khalid, who embraces his jihadist campaign after his father's death. Melikidze plays Khasan Dudayev, the brother of Amira. On November 4, 2016, it was announced that Moran Atias had joined the show as Sidra, Tony Almeida's associate who instigates feelings of distrust between Tony and Rebecca Ingram.

Promotion
It was announced that 24: Legacy is scheduled to premiere on February 5, 2017, serving as the lead-out program for Super Bowl LI. Fox released a trailer for the series on May 16, 2016, showing footage from the first episode. A promotional poster was released on July 15, 2016. 24: Legacy appeared at the 2016 San Diego Comic-Con on July 24, 2016, with a panel featuring Corey Hawkins, Miranda Otto, Jimmy Smits, Howard Gordon, Manny Coto, and Evan Katz, where fans were among the first to view scenes from the pilot episode. The cast promoted the show and talked about what would be happening on the show. It was announced on August 8, 2016, that Fox, in partnership with Samsung, would release a virtual reality tie-in experience, written by Howard Gordon, to precede the series' February 2017 debut. On August 10, 2016, a new behind-the-scenes video was released on the show's official YouTube account.

During Fox's TCA Press Tour, the producers revealed tidbits about the show, and its future seasons, to which executive producer Evan Katz revealed that the show would only have 12 episodes per season. The cast and crew of the show promoted the show at the 2016 New York Comic Con, where they showed the first half of the premiere episode. An extended trailer for the show was released by Fox during the first game of the World Series. Fox released several new promos on October 29, 2016, showcasing new clips from the series premiere.

Reception

Critical response
Review aggregator Rotten Tomatoes gives the series an approval rating of 60% based on 63 reviews, with an average rating of 5.5/10. The site's critical consensus reads, "24: Legacy offers well-acted escapism, yet this spin-off also inherits many of its predecessor's flaws, and an early narrative rut signals a missed opportunity for reinvention." On Metacritic the series has a score of 49 out of 100, based on 33 critics, indicating "mixed or average reviews".

Ratings

References

External links
 
 

2010s American crime drama television series
2017 American television series debuts
2017 American television series endings
 
American action television series
2010s American political television series
American television spin-offs
Espionage television series
Fox Broadcasting Company original programming
Serial drama television series
Super Bowl lead-out shows
Television series by 20th Century Fox Television
Television shows filmed in Georgia (U.S. state)
Television shows set in Washington, D.C.
Terrorism in television
American political drama television series
Television series by Imagine Entertainment